The 1934 Furman Purple Hurricane football team represented the Furman University as a member of the Southern Intercollegiate Athletic Association (SIAA) during the 1934 college football season. Led by third-year head coach Dizzy McLeod, the Purple Hurricane compiled an overall record of 5–4 with a mark of 4–0 in conference play, winning the SIAA title.

Schedule

References

Furman
Furman Paladins football seasons
Furman Purple Hurricane football